The Type 094 (Chinese designation: 09-IV; NATO reporting name: Jin class) is a class of ballistic missile submarine developed by China for the People's Liberation Army Navy Submarine Force. The Type 094 succeeds the Type 092 submarine and precedes the Type 096 submarine, which is under development.

Description

The Type 094's chief designer was Zhang Jinlin. It is likely based on the Type 093 nuclear-powered attack submarine.

A Type 094 was photographed by commercial satellites in late-2006 at the Xiaopingdao Submarine Base. The first commissioned in 2007 and six were in commission in 2020. They began nuclear deterrence patrols in December 2015.

The Type 094 is the China's "first credible sea-based nuclear deterrent" according to the United States Department of Defense. They were initially armed with 12 JL-2 SLBMs; each missile had one warhead and a  range capable of reaching parts of Alaska launched from near China. By late 2022, they were rearmed with JL-3 SLBMs able to reach the continental United States from the South China Sea; ranges of over  have been reported.

The Type 094A is a variant with a modified and improved sail. The sail appears to incorporate features from one installed on a modified Type 093.

Noise 
The Type 094 is noisier than contemporary submarines. In 2009, the Office of Naval Intelligence of the United States Navy listed the Type 094 as noisier than Soviet/Russian SSBNs from the late-1970s. In 2015, Australian researchers Brendan Thomas-Noone and Rorey Medcalf noted that noisiness and the range of the JL-2 limited the submarine's effectiveness in attacks on the contiguous United States, but not on India.

Boats

Gallery

See also
 List of submarine classes in service

References

Notes

Sources

 
Submarine classes
Ballistic missile submarines
Submarines of China
Nuclear-powered submarines
Nuclear submarines of the Chinese Navy